Elif Doğan (born 6 September 1994) is a Turkish actress. A graduate of Istanbul University with a degree in musical studies, Doğan started her career with a role in the TV series Aşk Laftan Anlamaz and continued her career in television with Hayat Bazen Tatlıdır. She was then cast in a supporting role in Çukur and had her first leading role in the series Darısı Başımıza. She further rose to prominence with her role as Azra in the 2020 series Gençliğim Eyvah.

Filmography 

{| class="wikitable" style="font-size: 90%;"
! colspan="4" style="background:LightSteelBlue"| Film
|-
! Year
! Title
! Role
! Notes
|-
| 2016 || Kayıp İnci ||  || Supporting role
|-
| 2017 || Emoji Filmi ||  || Voicing
|-
| 2017 || Şirinler 3: Kayıp Köy ||  || Voicing
|-
| 2017 || Bezmi Ezel ||  || Supporting role
|-
| 2020 || Aşk Tesadüfleri Sever 2 || Die Junga Sema || Leading role
|-
|}

Discography
 2020: "Bir Rüya Gördüm" (with Nesrin Javadzadeh) - Love Likes Coincidences 2'' soundtrack

References

External links 
 
 

1994 births
Actresses from Istanbul
21st-century Turkish actresses
Turkish television actresses
Turkish film actresses
Living people